Syllepte thomealis is a moth in the family Crambidae. It was described by Viette in 1957. It is endemic to São Tomé.

References

Moths described in 1957
Moths of Africa
thomealis
Taxa named by Pierre Viette